The 2007–08 BCHL season is the 46th season of the British Columbia Hockey League. It began on September 7, 2007, and ran through February 27, 2008, followed by the Fred Page Cup Playoffs, ending in April, 2008.  On February 28, the league announced a partnership with INSINC to live video stream the 2008 playoffs.

Scott Knowles of the Surrey Eagles scored the first goal of the season against the Langley Chiefs on September 7 in one of seven games on opening night.

The Nanaimo Clippers and Vernon Vipers matched up for the first time since the 2007 Fred Page Cup Finals on November 16, 2007, at Nanaimo.

Final Regular Season Statistics

Conference standings

Note: GP = Games played; W = Wins; L = Losses; T = Ties; OTL = Overtime losses; GF = Goals for; GA = Goals against; PTS = Points; Top six teams in each conference qualified for post-season playoffs.

Interior Conference

x - clinched playoff spot, y - clinched division title, e - eliminated from playoff contention

Coastal Conference

x - clinched playoff spot, y - clinched division title, e - eliminated from playoff contention

Scoring leaders

Note: GP = Games played; G = Goals; A = Assists; Pts = Points; PIM = Penalty minutes

As of February 28, 2008

Leading goaltenders
Note: GP = Games played; TOI = Time on ice (minutes); W = Wins; L = Losses; T = Ties; GA = Goals against; SO = Shutouts; Sv% = Save percentage; GAA = Goals against average

As of February 28, 2008

Playoff seeds
After the 2007–08 BCHL regular season, the standard of 12 teams qualified for 
the playoffs.

Coastal Conference
Nanaimo Clippers - Coastal Conference and BCHL regular season champion; 88 points
Langley Chiefs - 72 points
Surrey Eagles - 70 points
Burnaby Express - 69 points
Victoria Grizzlies - 68 points 
Powell River Kings - 63 points

Interior Conference
Penticton Vees - Interior Conference regular season champion; 86 points
Westside Warriors - 83 points
Salmon Arm Silverbacks - 80 points
Vernon Vipers - 76 points
Trail Smoke Eaters - 53 points 
Prince George Spruce Kings - 52 points

Playoff Bracket

In each round, the highest remaining seed in each conference is matched against the lowest remaining seed. The higher-seeded team is awarded home ice advantage, which gives them a maximum possible four games on their home ice, with the other team getting a maximum possible three. The opening elimination round follows a best-of-five 2-2-1 format. Each best-of-seven series follows a 2–2–1–1–1 format. This means that the higher-seeded team will have Games 1 and 2, plus 5 and 7 if necessary, played on their home ice, while the lower-seeded team will be at home for the other games. The format ensures that the team with home ice advantage will always have home ice for the "extra" game if there are an odd number of games in a series.

All Star Game
The BCHL All-Star Game was played at the Bear Mountain Arena in Victoria, British Columbia on January 23, 2008.  The Coastal Conference All-Stars won the game 15–9.

References

External links
BC Hockey League official website

BCHL
British Columbia Hockey League seasons